Elizabeth Gordon may refer to:

Elizabeth Gordon, Heiress of Gordon (died 1439), progenitress of the Gordon Earls and Marquesses of Huntly
Elizabeth Gordon, Countess of Huntly, Scottish noblewoman
Elizabeth Gordon, 19th Countess of Sutherland (1765–1839), Scottish peeress, involved in the Highland Clearances
Elizabeth Gordon, Duchess of Gordon (1794–1864), Scottish noblewoman and religious figure
Liz Gordon (born 1955), former New Zealand politician
Betty Gordon, a series of books
Elizabeth Gordon (tennis), female tennis player from South Africa in 1981 Wimbledon Championships – Women's Singles
Elizabeth Gordon (editor) (1906–2000), editor of House Beautiful magazine

See also
Gordon (surname)